True North is a 2020 Japanese-Korean animated film directed by Eiji Han Shimizu. Telling the story of a family held captive in a brutal North Korean political prison camp, the film is based on years of research and interviews with former political prisoners who defected to South Korea, the film incorporates elements of the real-life experiences of individuals who endured some of the worst human rights abuses of our time.

The film was screened at the 2020 Annecy International Animation Film Festival, nominated for feature films contrechamp in competition.

Plot
Park Yohan, a nine-year-old boy living in Pyongyang, his mother and younger sister are forcibly relocated to a notoriously cruel political prison camp in North Korea. His parents are Zainichi Koreans in the 1960s. His innocence is gradually eroded by the harsh brutality of the camp, while the rest of his family tries to maintain their decency and compassion for their fellow humans. Years later, after being devastated by the sudden and tragic loss of a loved one, he begins to reassess the meaning of his life - even as he struggles to survive in the worst imaginable living conditions.

Voice cast
Joel Sutton as Park Yohan
Michael Sasaki as Insu
Brandin Stennis
Emily Helles

Reception
The Hollywood Reporter: “A rare glimpse inside a North Korean prison camp. This tale is for anyone interested in learning more about one of the world's most blatant crimes against humanity."
Comic Book Resources: “TRUE NORTH will make you righteously angry, but it also manages to leave you with some sense of hope.”
Rotten Tomatoes: “Through this young boy’s eyes we witness the worst and the best of humanity. Proving once again that the medium can do more than children’s content, the animation here helps the subject matter leave a strong emotional mark and enables the filmmaker to access an unseen reality.”

External links

References

2020 films
2020 animated films
2020 computer-animated films
Japanese animated feature films
Japanese computer-animated films
Japanese 3D films
Indonesian animated films
Films set in North Korea
Films shot in Indonesia
2020s English-language films
Zainichi Korean culture